The Party for Democracy and Socialism was a registered political party in Burkina Faso (formerly Upper Volta).

In 1999 the African Independence Party (PAI) split, and Soumane Touré formed a parallel PAI. Since the PAI led by Touré, which joined the government, obtained the legal recognition of the name PAI, the other PAI registered PDS as its electoral party in 2002.

At the legislative elections, 5 May 2002, PDS won 1.7% of the popular vote and 2 out of 111 seats. In the presidential election of 13 November 2005, its candidate Philippe Ouédraogo won 2.28% of the popular vote.

At the 2007 parliamentary elections, the party again won 2 seats.

In 2012 the party merged into Party for Democracy and Socialism/Metba.

National conventions of PDS
5 March 2005: 1st National Convention
2 December 2006: 2nd National Convention

References

Political parties established in 2002
Defunct political parties in Burkina Faso
Communist parties in Burkina Faso
2002 establishments in Burkina Faso
Political parties disestablished in 2012